Salve the Goat...Iblis Exelsi is the debut EP by Singaporean black metal band Impiety. It was released in 1993, through the Dutch-based label Shivadarshana Records. Later made available as violet-colored 7" in the United States by Fudgeworthy Records.

The EP was recorded 15 September 1993, at The Womb of Leftness, Studio 666; compared to the preceding release, it was "recorded at a better studio with a more 'metal-educated' engineer. But likewise, most of the mixing and editing was personally done by me."

Track listing 
 "Cuntblasphemy – Paganistic Bitchgoddess Deiimpalation" – 3:31
 "Magick – Consecration Goatsodomy" – 5:29

Artwork 
The front cover shows the three band members with corpse paint and spikes in front of an inverted pentagram. The back cover features a statement insulting the early Norwegian black metal scene: "To All Norwegian 'Black-Metal' Clowns, We Desecrate your so-called Northern Kingdom & Sky of White Falseness… After which, We Baptise All of thee in Piss!!!" The band later explained that this was a reaction to a racist letter by Mortiis who had insulted them as "niggers" who had no right to play black metal.

Personnel 
Shyaithan – Vocals
Iblyss – Drums
Leprophiliac Rex – Guitars

References 

1993 EPs
Black metal EPs
Impiety (band) albums